The Alliance for Inclusive Education (ALLFIE) campaigns for the right of all disabled learners (including those with SEN) to be included and fully supported in mainstream education from early years through to further and higher education. It is a national campaigning and information sharing network run by Disabled people. ALLFIE was set up in London in 1990. ALLFIE's Director is Tara Flood.

Activities
ALLFIE lobbies for changes in legislation and policy that will increase access to mainstream education for disabled learners, and campaigns against educational reforms that undermine the full inclusion of disabled pupils and students. ALLFIE produces a termly magazine 'Inclusion Now' which features experiences of teachers, students and parents on their experiences of the education system, as well as feature articles on policy and practice.

ALLFIE's website hosts a number of resources on inclusive education. In 2013 ALLFIE produced a website and associated education pack based on a 2-year oral history project that interviewed more than 50 disabled people about their experiences of school. The "How Was School?" project sought to map the timeline of change from disabled learners having no access to education, through segregated education in special schools, to the present day where many disabled learners are well supported in mainstream education.

Campaigning
ALLFIE's campaigns are the core of its work. Current campaigns include “We Know Inclusion Works” which gathers evidence from young people, their families and education professionals about inclusive education working in practice. The “Educate Don’t Segregate” campaign was set up to counter the many attacks on inclusive education, such as proposals to expand selective education and cuts to Disabled Students Allowance.

Principles
ALLFIE believes that the whole education experience should be inclusive of disabled learners, both inside and outside the classroom. Disabled and non-disabled learners learning together creates opportunities for the building of relationships and the creation of an inclusive society that welcomes everyone.

Article 24 of the UN Convention on the Rights of Persons with Disabilities states that inclusive education is a right.

ALLFIE's principles, as stated in their manifesto are:
 Diversity enriches and strengthens all communities
 All learners' different learning styles and achievements are equally valued, respected and celebrated by society
 All learners are enabled to fulfil their potential by taking into account individual requirements and needs
 Support is guaranteed and fully resourced across the whole learning experience
 All learners need friendship and support from people of their own age.
 All children and young people are educated together as equals in their local communities
 Inclusive Education is incompatible with segregated provision both within and outside mainstream education

See also
Parents for Inclusion
Campaign for State Education
Centre for Studies on Inclusive Education

References

External links
Official website

Education in the London Borough of Lambeth
Educational organisations based in the United Kingdom
Organisations based in the London Borough of Lambeth
Stockwell